Lysophospholipid acyltransferase 5 is an enzyme that in humans is encoded by the LPCAT3 gene.
It is homologous to other membrane-bound O-acyltransferases.

Structure and function 
Based on the crystalographic and cryo-EM studies of its homolog in chicken (cLPCAT3), humane MBOAT5 has a typical MBOAT folding as other members such as SOAT1 and DGAT1, and the transmembrane helices hold a "T"-shape reaction chamber allowing the co-occupancy of a lysophosphatidylcholine (lysoPC) and a long polyunsaturated acyl-CoA, such as arachidonic acyl CoA. With the assistance of catalytic residues H374 and N338, the acyl chain could be transferred from the acyl CoA to the sn-2 position of lysoPC, thereby generating a new, polyunsaturated phospholipid.

Inhibition of LPCAT3 has been found to alter the cellular lipidome and is partially protective against ferroptosis.

References

Further reading

External links